Volleyball, for the 2017 Island Games, held at the Rävhagen, Visby, Gotland, Sweden in June 2017.

Teams are ranked, based on previous three Island Games results and will pay in a pool competition before playing a knockout.

Medal table

Results

References

Island Games
2017
Volleyball